Bijan Emkanian is an Iranian actor born on August 18, 1953 in Abadan, Iran.

Selected filmography
 Bijan and Dream and Shoes (Bijan o Khial o Kafsh), Short Film, 1969
 Liegemen, 1981
 The Chrysanthemums , 1984
 Burning spruces, 1989
 Longing for Marriage, 1990
 Reign of Love (TV series), 2000
 Intersection, 2005
 Come at sunset, 2004
 Underwater, 2009
 Ambush, 2013
 Crazy face, 2014
 Nahid, 2015
 Bachelors (serises)'', 2016 - 2018

References

External links

Iranian male television actors
Iranian male film actors
People from Abadan, Iran
Iranian film producers
1953 births
Living people